Gąsiorowski (feminine: Gąsiorowska) is a Polish noble family name, after Gąsiorów, Jarocin County, bearer of the Ślepowron coat of arms.

The surname may refer to:

Mark Gasiorowski
Dariusz Gąsiorowski, film producer
Florian Gąsiorowski, pen name of Henryk Struve
Janusz Gąsiorowski, Polish general
Wacław Gąsiorowski, Polish writer of popular historic novels
Joanna Gasiorowska, journalist, anchor for Al Jazeera English
Roma Gąsiorowska, film actress
Maiden name of Małgorzata Bocheńska